Euphoric means feeling great well-being or intense happiness.

Euphoric may also refer to:

 Euphoric (EP), by Delerium, 1991
 Euphoric (Record Label), a subsidiary of Almighty Records
 Euphoric, a utility to run Oric programs in PC and other systems

See also
 Euphoria (disambiguation)